Bab Cartagena or Carthage gate is one of the gates of the medina of Tunis, it located at the east of the former enclosure.

This door gave an access to the road leading to Carthage. It disappeared long before 1881.

References

External links

Cartagena